Leonardo Henriques Coelho (born 17 May 1993), known as Léo Coelho, is a Brazilian footballer who plays for Peñarol as a centre-back.

Club career
Born in Rio de Janeiro, Léo Coelho was a Nacional-SP youth graduate. He made his senior debut for the club on 30 April 2011 by starting in a 1–3 home loss against Jabaquara for the Campeonato Paulista Segunda Divisão championship,. 

Léo Coelho was subsequently loaned to Grêmio Barueri, Penapolense and Paraná, appearing with the latter in Série B. In January 2016 he moved to Rio Claro permanently.

On 18 May 2016 Léo Coelho was loaned to Santos, being initially assigned to the B-team. After being an undisputed starter during the year's Copa Paulista, he returned to Penapolense on 6 February 2017, also in a temporary deal.

Career statistics

References

External links

1993 births
Living people
Footballers from Rio de Janeiro (city)
Brazilian footballers
Association football defenders
Campeonato Brasileiro Série B players
Nacional Atlético Clube (SP) players
Grêmio Barueri Futebol players
Clube Atlético Penapolense players
Paraná Clube players
Rio Claro Futebol Clube players
Santos FC players
Associação Portuguesa de Desportos players
Comercial Futebol Clube (Ribeirão Preto) players
Uruguayan Primera División players
Liga MX players
Centro Atlético Fénix players
Atlético San Luis footballers
Club Nacional de Football players
Peñarol players
Brazilian expatriate footballers
Brazilian expatriate sportspeople in Uruguay
Expatriate footballers in Uruguay
Brazilian expatriate sportspeople in Mexico
Expatriate footballers in Mexico